Ek Je Aachhe Kanya (The Girl) is a Bengali movie released in 2001. Directed by  Subrata Sen and produced by Sandeep Sen,  the movie features Konkona Sen Sharma, Debashree Roy and Sabyasachi Chakrabarty. This movie is Konkona Sen Sharma's  cinematic debut and directorial debut of Subrata Sen.

Plot 
Anjan works in advertising and has recently rented a room in a house in the suburbs of Calcutta. Eighteen-year-old Ria, who lives there with her grand father, falls in love with the new tenant. But Anjan already has a long-time girlfriend Rupa, who works with him in advertising. The rejected girl tries in vain to win Anjan’s favour. When she sees that her efforts are futile she starts to make trouble for the couple. At first her mischief is only minor, but it is followed by more serious threats to Anjan’s advertising project. And when the couple announces their engagement the girl becomes so enraged that she tries to kill them. A year later Ria is released from a mental institution because the doctors believe her to be stable. Anjan and Rupa are married and have moved away. But a new tenant has moved into grandfather’s house… The film candidly reflects the culture degradation of the metropolitan environment, of traditional interpersonal relationships and points to the raising crime rate among young people.

Cast 
 Konkona Sen Sharma as Ria (as Konkona Sensharma)
 Sabyasachi Chakrabarty as Anjan
 Debashree Roy as Rupa
 Suchita Ray Chaudhury as Ria's mother
 Bhola Dutta as Mr. Samaddar (Ria's grandfather)
 Arjun Chakraborty as New tenant

Crew
 Directed Subrata Sen
 Screenplay Subrata Sen
 Produced Sandeep Sen
 Music  Debojyoti Mishra
 Cinematography  Shirsha Roy
 Film Editing  Raviranjan Maitra
 Art Direction Indranil Ghosh

Awards 
Gollapudi Srinivas National Award For Best Indian Directorial Debut,
Kalakar Award for the Best Feature Film.
Best Actress, Best Music and Best Cinematography awards by                    BFJA.
Official selection at Karlovy Vary Film Festival

References

External links

2001 films
Bengali-language Indian films
Films set in Kolkata
Films directed by Subrata Sen
2001 directorial debut films
2000s Bengali-language films